The Cauvery barb (Puntius cauveriensis) is a species of cyprinid fish endemic to the Cauvery River in Karnataka, India.

References

 

cauveriensis
Cyprinid fish of Asia
Fish of India
Taxa named by Sunder Lal Hora
Fish described in 1937
Barbs (fish)